The 1961 season was the Hawthorn Football Club's 37th season in the Victorian Football League and 60th overall. The season was a historic one for Hawthorn finishing top of the ladder and claiming the McClelland Trophy for the first time in their history, reaching the Grand Final for the first time in their history, and winning the Premiership for the first time in their history.

Fixture

Premiership Season

Finals Series

Ladder

References

Hawthorn Football Club seasons